The Iolani Palace was the royal residence of the rulers of the Kingdom of Hawaiʻi beginning with Kamehameha III under the Kamehameha Dynasty (1845) and ending with Queen Liliʻuokalani (1893) under the Kalākaua Dynasty, founded by her brother, King David Kalākaua. It is located in the capitol district of downtown Honolulu in the U.S. state of Hawaii. It is now a National Historic Landmark listed on the National Register of Historic Places. After the monarchy was overthrown in 1893, the building was used as the capitol building for the Provisional Government, Republic, Territory, and State of Hawaii until 1969. The palace was restored and opened to the public as a museum in 1978. ʻIolani Palace is the only royal palace on US soil.

Early history

Pohukaina and the House of Kamehameha 

In the early 19th century, the site of ʻIolani Palace was near an ancient burial site was known as Pohukaina. It is believed to be the name of a chief (sometimes spelled Pahukaina) who according to legend chose a cave in Kanehoalani in the Koʻolau Range for his resting place. The land belonged to Kekauluohi, who later served as Kuhina Nui. She lived there with her husband Charles Kanaina. Kekūanāoʻa, a chief who served as Governor of Oʻahu, also had his home, called Haliimaile, just west of Kekauluohi's home. Another chief, Keoni Ana, lived in Kīnaʻu Hale (which was later converted into the residence of the royal chamberlain), all members of the House of Kamehameha.

Kekāuluohi and Kanaʻina's original home was similar to that of the other estates in the neighborhood consisting of small buildings used for different purposes. The sitting and sleeping area had a folding door entrance of green painted wood under glass upper panels. The house had two rooms separated by a festooned tent door of chintz fabric and was carpeted with hand crafted makaloa mats. In the front was a lounge area opposite a sideboard and mirror. In the middle they placed a semi circle of armchairs with a center table where the couple would write. Four matching cabinet-bookshelves with glass doors were set in each corner of the room with silk scarves hanging from each. In his book, A visit to the South Seas, in the U.S. Ship Vincennes: during the years 1829 and 1830, Charles Samuel Stewart describes the area and homes in detail.

Next to Kekāuluohi and Kanaʻina's home was an old estate that had been demolished called Hanailoia. According to oral history, Hanailoia was the former site of a destroyed heiau called Kaʻahaimauli.

Tomb 
Pohukaina was a sacred burial site for the aliʻi (ruling class). Years after 1825, the first Western-style royal tomb was constructed for the bodies of King Kamehameha II and his queen Kamāmalu. They were buried on August 23, 1825. The idea was heavily influenced by the tombs at Westminster Abbey during Kamehameha II's trip to London. The mausoleum was a small house made of coral blocks with a thatched roof. It had no windows, and it was the duty of two chiefs to guard the iron-locked koa door day and night. No one was allowed to enter the vault except for burials or Memorial Day, a Hawaiian holiday celebrated on December 30.

Over time, as more bodies were added, the small vault became crowded, so other chiefs and retainers were buried in unmarked graves nearby. In 1865 a selected 20 coffins were removed to the Royal Mausoleum of Hawaiʻi, called Mauna ʻAla, in Nuʻuanu Valley. But many chiefs remain at Pohukaina, including Keaweʻīkekahialiʻiokamoku, Kalaniopuu, Chiefess Kapiolani, and Timothy Haalilio.

After being overgrown for many years, the Hawaiian Historical Society passed a resolution in 1930 requesting Governor Lawrence Judd to memorialize the site with the construction of a metal fence enclosure and a plaque.

According to tradition, Pohukaina was built on the site of a former cave.

Hale Aliʻi 

In July 1844, Kekūanāoʻa began building a large home at the site of the current palace as a gift to his daughter Victoria Kamāmalu. Instead, Kamehameha III purchased the estate and used the home as his royal residence after moving the capital of the kingdom to Honolulu from Lāhainā. It would become the Iolani Palace. As older alii died, the lands were passed down and concentrated into fewer hands. Kekāuluohi's lands were passed down to her from the Kamehameha family. When she died, she left her accumulated lands and wealth to her son, not her husband Kanaʻina however, Lunalilo predeceased his father.

The home built by Kekūanāoʻa was a wood and stone building called Hale Aliʻi meaning (House of the Chiefs). It had only one-third the floor space of the present palace. Mataio Kekūanāoʻa, who was long-time Royal Governor of Oʻahu and husband of Kīnaʻu, the daughter of Kamehameha I. He built the large home for his daughter Princess Victoria Kamāmalu who, from birth, was expected to rule in some capacity. It was purchased by King Kamehameha III from Kamāmalu (the King's niece) when he moved his capital from Lahaina to Honolulu in 1845.

It was constructed as a traditional aliʻi residence with only ceremonial spaces, no sleeping rooms. It just had a throne room, a reception room, and a state dining room, with other houses around for sleeping and for retainers. Kamehameha III slept in a cooler grass hut around the palace. He called his home Hoʻihoʻikea, a separate building flanking the palace on the west side in honor of his restoration after the Paulet Affair of 1843. Kamehameha IV build a separate house on the east side of the palace called Ihikapukalani (on the mauka side) and Kauluhinano (on the makai side).

Name changed to ʻIolani Palace 

During Kamehameha V's reign Hale Aliʻi's name was changed to ʻIolani Palace, after his brother Kamehameha IV's given names (his full name was Alexander Liholiho Keawenui ʻIolani). It refers to the ʻIo (royal hawk). The Palace served as the official residence of the monarch during the reigns of Kamehameha III, Kamehameha IV, Kamehameha V, Lunalilo, and the first part of Kalākaua's reign.
The original structure was very simple in design and was more of a stately home than a palace, but at the time, it was the grandest house in town. The palace was largely meant for receiving foreign dignitaries and state functions with the monarch preferring to sleep in private homes.

Seat of government
Kamehameha I formed his official government at Lahaina, Maui in 1802, where he built the kingdom's first royal residence called the Brick Palace. Lahaina remained the seat of government under the first three Kamehameha monarchs until 1845 when Kamehameha III moved the royal court. Lahaina had been the seat of government, where the royal courts of many chiefs of Maui had been located, including Kahekili II until 1794. In 1845 Kamehameha III moved the Royal Court and capitol to Honolulu. Hale Ali'i would become the seat of government and would remain so through the subsequent Kamehameha monarchs. After 1874, the main seat of government was transferred to the new central government building left by Kamehameha V. After the overthrow the provisional government would use the Iolani Palace as the seat of government. While a territory, the palace was called: The Capitol of the Territorial Government. It would also serve as the first state capitol building. The area was culturally significant as a seat of government for many reasons including the palaces size, orientation and other factors of religious importance and bridged the ancient history of Hawaiʻi with the new 19th century monarchy.

Kalākaua's ʻIolani Palace

By the time David Kalākaua assumed the throne, the original Iolani Palace was in poor condition, suffering from ground termite damage. He ordered the old palace to be razed.

Kalākaua was the first monarch to travel around the world and like Kamehameha V, he dreamed of a royal palace befitting the monarch of a modern state. While visiting Europe, Kalākaua took note of the customs and traditions practiced by his contemporaries where he decided that incorporating their elements would help legitimize his kingdom through their eyes; this included the building of a new palace inspired by these European  grand palaces. Thus, he commissioned the construction of a new Iolani Palace, directly across the street from Aliiōlani Hale, to become the official palace of the Hawaiian monarchy.

Design and construction
Three architects, Thomas J. Baker, Charles J. Wall, and Isaac Moore, contributed to the design; of these, Baker designed the structure, while Wall and Moore offered other details. The cornerstone was laid December 31, 1879 during the administration of Minister of the Interior Samuel Gardner Wilder. It was built of brick with concrete facing. The building was completed in November 1882 and cost over $340,000 — a vast fortune at the time ($ in  dollars ). On February 12, 1883, a formal European-style coronation ceremony was held, even though Kalākaua had reigned for nine years. The coronation pavilion officially known as Keliiponi Hale was later moved to the southwest corner of the grounds and converted to a bandstand for the Royal Hawaiian Band.

Iolani Palace features architecture seen nowhere else in the world. This unique style is known as American Florentine. On the first floor a grand hall faces a staircase of koa wood. Ornamental plaster decorates the interior. The throne room (southeast corner), the blue meeting room, and the dining room adjoin the hall. The blue room included a large 1848 portrait of King Louis Philippe of France and a koa wood piano where Liliuokalani played her compositions for guests. Upstairs are the private library and bedrooms of the Hawaiian monarchs.

It served as the official residence of the Hawaiian monarch until the 1893 overthrow of the Kingdom of Hawaiʻi. Therein not only Liliuokalani, but, Queen Kapiolani and other royal retainers were evicted from the palace after the overthrow.

The palace is the only official state residence of royalty on U.S. soil.

Royal imprisonment and trial

Upon the overthrow of the monarchy by the Committee of Safety in 1893, troops of the newly formed Provisional Government of Hawaii took control of Iolani Palace. After a few months government offices moved in and it was renamed the "Executive Building" for the Republic of Hawaii. Government officials carefully inventoried its contents and sold at public auctions whatever furniture or furnishings were not suitable for government operations. Queen Liliuokalani was imprisoned for nine months in a small room on the upper floor after the second of the Wilcox rebellions in 1895. The quilt she made is still there. The trial was held in the former throne room.

 
When a proposed annexation treaty up for ratification, the Hawaiian Patriotic League held a protest rally at the palace on September 6, 1897. They gathered petition signatures in an effort to demonstrate the treaty did not have popular support. On August 12, 1898, U.S. troops from the  came ashore and raised the Flag of the United States at the palace to mark the annexation by the Newlands Resolution. The Queen and other Hawaiian nobles did not attend, staying at Washington Place instead. The building served as the capitol of the Territory of Hawaii, the military headquarters during World War II, and the State of Hawaii. During the government use of the palace, the second floor royal bedroom became the governor's office, while the legislature occupied the entire first floor. The representatives met in the former throne room and the senate in the former dining room.

When Liliuokalani died in 1917, territorial governor Lucius E. Pinkham accorded her the honor of a state funeral in the throne room of the palace.

Archives
After annexation, there was a fear that all records would be moved to the mainland. Since an 1847 effort by Robert Crichton Wyllie, a set of archives had been kept of all kingdom records. A new fireproof  building was built in 1906 on the grounds just to the southeast of the palace. At first it was to be called the Hall of Records, but the name Archives of Hawaiʻi made it clear the documents included those from the kingdom. A new Kekāuluohi  building provides digital access to some of the collections.

Palace restoration 

In 1930 the interior of ʻIolani Palace was remodeled, and wood framing replaced by steel and reinforced concrete. The name ʻIolani Palace was officially restored in 1935.
During World War II, it served as the temporary headquarters for the military governor in charge of martial law in the Hawaiian Islands.

The Hawaiian soldiers of Japanese ancestry who were accepted for service in the U.S. Army became the core of the 442nd Infantry Regiment. Before leaving Hawaiʻi for training on the mainland, they were sworn in during a mass ceremony on the grounds of the Palace.

Through more than 70 years as a functional but neglected government building, the Palace fell into disrepair. After Hawaiʻi became a state, Governor John A. Burns began an effort to restore the palace in the 1960s. The first step was to move the former ʻIolani Barracks building from its original position northeast of the palace. It now serves as a visitors center for the palace.

ʻIolani Palace  was designated a National Historic Landmark on December 29, 1962 and added as site 66000293 to the National Register of Historic Places listings in Oahu on October 15, 1966. Government offices vacated the Palace in 1969 and moved to the  newly constructed Hawaiʻi State Capitol building on the former barracks site. In preparation for restoration, the Junior League of Honolulu researched construction, furnishings, and palace lifestyle in nineteenth-century newspapers, photographs and archival manuscripts. Overseeing the restoration was The Friends of ʻIolani Palace, founded by Liliʻuokalani Kawānanakoa Morris, grand-niece of Queen Kapiʻolani. Two wooden additions were removed and the interior was restored based on original plans.

Through the efforts of acquisitions researchers and professional museum staff, and donations of individuals, many original Palace objects have been returned. Government grants and private donations funded reproduction of original fabrics and finishes to restore Palace rooms to their monarchy era appearance. ʻIolani Palace opened to the public in 1978 after structural restoration of the building was completed. In the basement is a photographic display of the Palace, orders and decorations given by the monarchs, and an exhibit outlining restoration efforts.

The grounds of ʻIolani Palace are managed by the Hawaiʻi State Department of Land and Natural Resources but the palace building itself is managed as a historical house museum by the Friends of ʻIolani Palace, a non-profit non-governmental organization. The birthdays of King Kalākaua (November 16) and Queen Kapiʻolani (December 28) are celebrated with ceremonies.

ʻIolani Palace is one of the only places in Hawaiʻi where the flag of Hawaiʻi can officially fly alone without the American flag; the other three places are Puʻuhonua o Hōnaunau Heiau, the Mauna ʻAla and Thomas Square.

Contemporary events 
On January 17, 1993, a massive observation was held on the grounds of ʻIolani Palace to mark the 100th anniversary of the overthrow of the Hawaiian monarchy. A torchlight vigil was held at night, with the palace draped in black.

On April 30, 2008, ʻIolani Palace was overtaken by a group of native Hawaiians who called themselves the Hawaiian Kingdom Government to protest what they view as illegitimate rule by the United States. Mahealani Kahau, "head of state" of the group, said they do not recognize Hawaiʻi as a U.S. state, but would keep the occupation of the palace peaceful. "The Hawaiian Kingdom Government is here and it doesn't plan to leave. This is a continuity of the Hawaiian Kingdom of 1892 to today," Kahau said. Friends of ʻIolani Palace released a statement stating: "We respect the freedom of Hawaiian groups to hold an opinion on the overthrow of the Hawaiian Kingdom, we believe that blocking public access to Iolani Palace is wrong and certainly detrimental to our mission to share the Palace and its history with our residents, our keiki (children), and our visitors."

In popular culture 
An exterior view of the Palace was frequently shown on the 1968 TV show Hawaii Five-O, suggesting it hosted the offices of the fictional state police unit featured on the show. It was also later portrayed in the late 1980s and early 1990s as the headquarters of the Honolulu Prosecuting Attorney, including Jason McCabe, in the TV series Jake and the Fatman.

A movie titled Princess Kaiulani about Princess Victoria Kaʻiulani Cleghorn was filmed at the palace in 2008.

Gallery

Citations

References

External links

  Friends of Iolani Palace
 Iolani Palace oral history on Pacific Worlds
 Iolani Palace and the Overthrow of the Monarchy on Pacific Worlds
 Coffman, Tom,  (2006).David Hoole; Nyla Fujii; Eric Nemoto and Gary Ontai. (2006).  The First Battle: the Battle for Equality in War-time Hawaii. San Francisco: Center for Asian American Media.   OCLC 72700683
 
 
 

Symbols of Hawaii
Legislative buildings
Royal residences in Hawaii
Palaces in the United States
Historic house museums in Hawaii
National Historic Landmarks in Hawaii
Houses on the National Register of Historic Places in Hawaii
Museums in Honolulu
Houses completed in 1882
Houses in Honolulu County, Hawaii
Protected areas established in 1962
State parks of Hawaii
Historic American Buildings Survey in Hawaii
1882 establishments in Hawaii
National Register of Historic Places in Honolulu